Holly Clyburn (born 7 February 1991) is an English professional golfer who currently plays on the Ladies European Tour. She was a member of the victorious 2012 Great Britain and Ireland Curtis Cup team and won her first professional tournament at the Deloitte Ladies Open in 2013, her rookie year on tour.

Amateur career
Clyburn was twice a member of the Great Britain and Ireland Curtis Cup team, selected in both 2010 and 2012. At the 2012 event, she won three of her five matches, playing in all sessions and contributing three points to a first victory for GB&I since 1996. She also qualified for the 2012 Women's British Open for the first time finishing tied for 26th, the second highest placed amateur. Clyburn turned professional in October 2012.

Professional career
In December 2012, Clyburn tied 25th at the Lalla Aicha Tour School to earn her tour card for the 2013 Ladies European Tour.   In her rookie year of 2013, she won her first tournament, the Deloitte Ladies Open in Amsterdam, and finished 7th on the LET Order of Merit. The latter was helped by two additional top 10 finishes, tied 6th at the Turkish Airlines Ladies Open and 3rd at the Ladies Scottish Open. In addition Clyburn appeared at two majors, the Women's British Open where she tied for 36th and the Evian Championship, where she tied for 27th. She was narrowly beaten to the title of LET Rookie of the Year by Charley Hull, when Hull placed higher in the final tournament of the season.
 
In 2014, Clyburn secured more top ten finishes, including tied for 6th at the Lalla Meryem Cup, tied for 9th at the Turkish Airlines Ladies Open, and runner-up to Florentyna Parker at the Ladies Italian Open. She appeared at major championships the Women's British Open and came through qualifying for the U.S. Women's Open but missed the cut at both.

In March 2015, Clyburn secured her second professional victory at the ALPG season ending event, the Bing Lee Fujitsu NSW Women's Open. The win was her first on the ALPG Tour.

Professional wins (4)

Ladies European Tour (1)

ALPG Tour wins (2)

LET Access Series wins (1)
2012 Banesto Tour Valencia

Team appearances
Amateur
European Ladies' Team Championship (representing England ): 2009, 2010, 2011
Curtis Cup (representing Great Britain & Ireland): 2010, 2012 (winners)
Espirito Santo Trophy (representing England): 2010
Vagliano Trophy (representing Great Britain & Ireland): 2011
Astor Trophy (representing Great Britain and Ireland): 2011 (winners)

Professional
International Crown (representing England): 2016
The Queens (representing Europe): 2017
European Championships (representing Great Britain): 2018

References

External links

English female golfers
Ladies European Tour golfers
LPGA Tour golfers
Sportspeople from Grimsby
1991 births
Living people